Thomas Gass is a Swiss diplomat who currently serves as Ambassador of Switzerland to the Socialist Republic of Viet Nam.

Education
Gass holds a PhD in natural sciences and an MSc in engineering diploma in agricultural sciences, both from the Swiss Federal Institute of Technology in Zurich (ETH). He prepared his Baccalaureate in Mathematics and Physics at the Externat Notre Dame in Grenoble, France.

Career
From 2018 to 2022, Gass served as Assistant Director General and Head of the South Cooperation Department of the Swiss Agency for Development and Cooperation. During this period, from 2019-2022, he was also Co-Chair of the Global Partnership for Effective Development Co-operation, and in this capacity oversaw the organisation of the Partnership's Summit, held 12-14 December 2022, in Geneva.

From August 2013 to December 2017, Gass served as the United Nations Assistant Secretary-General for Policy Coordination and Inter-Agency Affairs in the United Nations Department of Economic and Social Affairs (UN DESA). During this period, he was involved in the preparation of the 2030 Agenda for Sustainable Development and its Sustainable Development Goals. He was also an ex officio member of The UN Secretary-General's Independent Expert Advisory Group on a Data Revolution for Sustainable Development (IEAG) which produced the report "A World That Counts: Mobilising The Data Revolution for Sustainable Development". 

From 2009 to 2013, Gass served as Head of the Mission of Switzerland to Nepal (Ambassador and Country Director of the Swiss Agency for Development and Cooperation), where he lead the establishment of the Embassy of Switzerland in Nepal, and ensured the delivery of a development cooperation programme of up to 33 million dollars a year. He also chaired the Donors of the Nepal Peace Trust Fund, the main instrument for international support to Nepal’s peace process.

From 2004 to 2009, Gass served as Head of the Economic and Development Section at the Permanent Mission of Switzerland to the UN in New York, where he represented Switzerland’s interests, in particular in the Economic and Social Council (United Nations Economic and Social Council (ECOSOC), its subsidiary Commissions, the General Assembly and the Executive Boards of the major UN Funds and Programmes. During this time, he chaired the Donor Group of the UN Global Compact. In 2006, he served as Vice-President of the Western European and Others Group of the United Nations Commission on Population and Development and in 2008 he was appointed the Vice-President of the Executive Board of UNDP/UNFPA. In 2007, he successfully facilitated a United Nations resolution on the quadrennial comprehensive policy review (QCPR), the periodic review of the General Assembly operational system for development.

Earlier in his career, Gass served as Policy and Programme Officer for the Swiss Agency for Development and Cooperation, as Deputy Resident Representative of the United Nations Development Programme (UNDP) in Guyana, and as Regional Director for Europe with the International Plant Genetic Resources Institute in Rome.

Other activities
The Global Community Engagement and Resilience Fund (GCERF), Representing Switzerland on the Board (2018-2022) 
 Global Partnership for Effective Development Co-operation, Co-Chair (2019-2022)

Personal life
Gass is married and parent of three adult children.

References

Swiss officials of the United Nations
Living people
Year of birth missing (living people)